Paul Alan Evans (born 14 September 1964) is an English former professional footballer who played as a forward.

Career
Evans began his career with Cardiff City, making his professional debut as a substitute in place of Wayne Matthews during a 1–0 defeat to Blackburn Rovers in December 1983. However, he made just one further appearance for the club before being released. He later returned to the Football League with Newport County in 1987.

References

1964 births
Living people
English footballers
Cardiff City F.C. players
Newport County A.F.C. players
English Football League players
Association football forwards
Brecon Corinthians F.C. players